The  1985 Air Canada Silver Broom, the men's world curling championship, was held from 25 to 31 March at the Kelvin Hall in Glasgow, Scotland.

Teams

Round robin standings

Round robin results

Draw 1

Draw 2

Draw 3

Draw 4

Draw 5

Draw 6

Draw 7

Draw 8

Draw 9

Tiebreakers

Round 1

Round 2

Playoffs

Semifinals

Final

External links

Video:  (part of opening ceremony)

1985 in curling
1985 in Scottish sport
International curling competitions hosted by Scotland
International sports competitions in Glasgow
World Men's Curling Championship
March 1985 sports events in the United Kingdom
1980s in Glasgow